Castagneto Po is a comune (municipality) in the Metropolitan City of Turin in the Italian region Piedmont, located about  northeast of Turin.

Castagneto Po borders the following municipalities: Chivasso, San Sebastiano da Po, San Raffaele Cimena, Casalborgone, and Rivalba.

References

Cities and towns in Piedmont